Shivamandir  is a town in Kawaswati Municipality in Nawalparasi District in the Lumbini Zone of southern Nepal. The municipality was formed by merging the existing Kawaswati, Shivamandir, Pithauli, Agryouli VDCs. At the time of the 1991 Nepal census it had a population of 12,948 people living in 2362 individual households.

References

this is laxman rijal from shivamandir 2 kawasoti nawalparasi 
phone no 9847093561 bye

Populated places in Parasi District